Llangelynnin (also Llangelynin) is a small village and community near Tywyn, Gwynedd, Wales.  Although the village is usually known as Llangelynnin in English, the community name used is Llangelynin.

St Celynnin's Church
The parish church is dedicated to Saint Celynnin. The church dates from the 13th century and was extensively restored and probably extended in the late 15th or early 16th century. It had minor restorations in the 19th and 20th centuries but retains most of its medieval character. There is a 17th-century porch and bellcote at the south end, with a bell inscribed with the date 1660.

The interior of the church includes 17th-century wall paintings with texts and a skeletal figure. The benches date from about 1823 and record the names, addresses and occupations of their nineteenth-century occupants.

The church is disused, and is a Grade I listed building.

Location, history and amenities 
Llangelynnin sits on a slope above Cardigan Bay to the north of Tywyn. The A493 road and Cambrian Coast railway pass through the village, although the railway station closed in 1991.

The poet and scholar John Morgan was born in the village and Abram Wood, a famous Welsh gypsy, was buried there in 1799.

The community of Llangelynin includes the larger village of Llwyngwril, the village of Tonfanau and the hamlet of Rhoslefain within its boundaries. It has an area of 2,154 hectares and a population of 708 (2001 census), reducing to 673 at the 2011 census.

Governance
An electoral ward in the same name exists. This ward includes the community of Arthog with a total population at the 2011 census of 2,008.

References
Davies, John; Jenkins, Nigel; Baines, Menna & Lynch, Peredur I. (2008) The Welsh Academy Encyclopaedia of Wales, University of Wales Press, Cardiff.

External links

A Vision of Britain through time: Llangelynnin
www.geograph.co.uk : photos of Llangelynnin and surrounding area

Villages in Gwynedd
Llangelynin, Gwynedd
Villages in Snowdonia